Bogusław Mamiński (born 18 December 1955 in Kamień Pomorski) is a retired long-distance runner from Poland, known for winning the silver medal in the men's 3,000m Steeplechase event at the 1982 European Championships in Athens, Greece. He did the same one year later at the inaugural World Championships. Mamiński set his personal best (8:09.18) in the event on 24 August 1984 at a meet in Brussels, Belgium.

International competitions

1Representing Europe
2Did not finish in the final

Personal bests
1500 metres – 3:38.93 (Rome 1980)
3000 metres – 7:47.12 (Lausanne 1985)
5000 metres – 13:26.09 (Nice 1980)
2000 metres steeplechase – 5:20.81 (Oslo 1984)
3000 metres steeplechase – 8:09.18 (Brussels 1984)

References 
1982 Year Ranking

All-Athletics profile

1955 births
Living people
Polish male long-distance runners
Polish male steeplechase runners
Athletes (track and field) at the 1980 Summer Olympics
Athletes (track and field) at the 1988 Summer Olympics
Olympic athletes of Poland
World Athletics Championships medalists
People from Kamień Pomorski
European Athletics Championships medalists
Sportspeople from West Pomeranian Voivodeship
Legia Warsaw athletes
Competitors at the 1986 Goodwill Games
Friendship Games medalists in athletics